Ibrāhīm ibn Ṣāliḥ ibn ʿAlī al-Hāshimī (died 792) was a member of the Banu al-Abbas who served as a governor of various provinces in Syria and Egypt in the late eighth century.

Career
Ibrahim was a son of Salih ibn Ali, a military commander who participated in the conquest of Syria and Egypt during the Abbasid Revolution and later became governor of both regions. As a member of the Banu al-Abbas, he was a first cousin to the first two Abbasid caliphs al-Saffah and al-Mansur, and was additionally a son-in-law to the third caliph al-Mahdi by virtue of his marriage to the latter's daughter Abbasa.

In 781 Ibrahim was appointed by al-Mahdi as governor of Egypt, with jurisdiction over both military and financial affairs within the province. During his administration one Dihyah ibn Mus'ab, a descendant of the Umayyad Abd al-Aziz ibn Marwan, launched an anti-tax revolt in Upper Egypt and proclaimed himself as caliph. Ibrahim apparently had a lackadaisical response to the affair, and within a short time much of Upper Egypt had fallen under Dihyah's control. As a result of his failure to stamp out the rebel, an angered al-Mahdi removed him from office in 784, and his assistants were forced to hand over a fine of 300,000 dinars to his successor Musa ibn Mus'ab al-Khath'ami before he was able to return to Baghdad.

During the 780s Ibrahim held several governorships in his father's old powerbase in Syria. As early as 780 he is mentioned as being governor of Palestine, and by the end of al-Mahdi's reign he was in charge of the districts of Damascus and Jordan. Under al-Hadi he was retained in those positions and was additionally granted Cyprus and the Jazira. Following the accession of Harun al-Rashid he lost his offices, but in 788 he was restored to the governorship of Damascus.

During his later tenure in Damascus, Ibrahim was forced to deal with a violent conflict that had broken out between the Qays and Yemen tribes of the region. He was eventually able to negotiate a truce between the two factions in 791, after which he led a delegation of Syrian ashraf to meet the caliph in Iraq. Despite his efforts, however, the cessation of hostilities proved to be short-lived, as the rebellion of Abu al-Haydham broke out soon after his departure from the province.

Ibrahim died in 792, shortly after having been appointed governor of Egypt a second time.

Notes

References
 

 
 
 
 
 
 
 
 

792 deaths
8th-century Abbasid governors of Egypt
Year of birth unknown
Abbasids
Abbasid governors of Egypt
Abbasid governors of Damascus
8th-century Arabs